Jéssica Carolina Alves dos Reis (born 17 March 1993) is a Brazilian athlete specialising in the long jump. She has won multiple medals on regional level.

Her personal bests in the event are 6.66 metres outdoors (+1.2 m/s, São Paulo 2014) and 6.44 metres indoors (Eaubonne 2016).

International competitions

References

Living people
1993 births
Brazilian female long jumpers
Athletes (track and field) at the 2010 Summer Youth Olympics
South American Games silver medalists for Brazil
South American Games medalists in athletics
Competitors at the 2014 South American Games
Athletes (track and field) at the 2018 South American Games
20th-century Brazilian women
21st-century Brazilian women